Talent High School - Il sogno di Sofia  is an Italian sitcom, produced by Lux Vide, whose main character, Sofia, played by Alice Bellagamba, is a young girl passionate about dancing.

Overview 
Sofia Perri, daughter of mechanic Sirio, dreams of entering the Talent High School Academy to harness her passions, cultivated on her own, of dancing and singing. Often disappointed in her hopes of success, decides to impersonate Allegra De Magistriis, the daughter of a Hollywood producer. From time to time her act for good air flow is likely to be with funny results.

Cast

Main cast 
 Alice Bellagamba as Sofia Perri, Sofia lives with her father Sirio, a mechanic in a workshop on the outskirts of the city. She has one dream: dancing. Self-taught, she has always danced, among the cars and machinery of the workshop, hidden from her father who doesn't understand or approve of her passion. She shows real talent for modern dance, but is incapable of doing a single step of classical ballet. Self-confident and forthright, Sofia grew up in a working-class neighborhood and is used to getting by on her own. She has a strong sense of justice and doesn't understand anything about trendy attitudes. She is tenacious and does all she can to get into Talent High School, a first class academy for the performing arts. The entry requirements are very demanding: applicants need to go through a tough selection process, but also prove that they have attended other equally exclusive establishments, something that Sofia cannot do and, as a result, is not accepted by the school. One last chance comes her way in the shape of Allegra de Magistriis, daughter of a very famous Hollywood producer. Allegra backs out of the place she was assigned at Talent High School and Sofia, her spitting image, decides to risk assuming her identity. And so Sofia begins a new and exciting life made up of dance, acting and singing lessons and ...lies! Because Sofia will have to lie every day to her teachers, her fellow students and even to her father who thinks she is studying at a business college.
 Alice Bellagamba as Allegra De Magistriis, Everyone looks at her as a reference point, the girl from across the Atlantic who launches new styles each time she takes a breath. Always perfect, always fashionable and full of talent for dancing. When she impersonates Allegra, Sofia has to act like a snob, pretend to have the world at her feet, move with nonchalance and always prove herself worthy of every situation, without any weakness ... A far from easy task! The real De Magistriis is a fairly reserved young woman ... she is known for her talent, for the awards she has received for her dancing and for her famous parents. People's expectations are huge: “Is it true ... you really met ... and you danced with ...” Their comments are meaningless. Couldn't Sofia have resembled someone with a lower profile? In spite of all this, “Sofia/Allegra” is a friendly girl, a leader capable of creating a pleasant atmosphere in her circle of friends... also thanks to her working-class spontaneity that surfaces from time to time.
 Gianluca Vicari as Bart, He is hot! And an excellent dancer. The whole school admires him, but he is rather unfriendly and aggressive. Always on the defensive, he keeps his distance and has the ability to be cruelly and violently honest. He is no doubt the most talented student at the school, but wishes he was elsewhere. His father, a music producer, forces him to attend the Academy. Bart's dream, on the other hand, is to study engineering in order to work with engines and get a job with Ferrari. Sofia is the only one to find out about this passion, just as he is the only one to discover her dual identity. After clashing at first, the two of them realize that they can help each other out. Bart will teach Sofia classical ballet while Sofia will introduce Bart to her father Sirio, who will teach him all about mechanics.
 Emanuela Di Crosta as Greta, Greta is ... Greta. A world apart, a world all of her own. She loves to write and is the best student in the creative writing class. There isn't a single second or minute of the day when Greta isn't thinking about or writing poems, short stories and wacky monologues. She is a slightly strange girl but good- natured, full of enthusiasm and always capable of seeing the good side of situations and people. When she does cause trouble, it's not because she's mean ... but because she's so naïve! She is generous and a true friend who often gives good, albeit “unorthodox” advice. Her eccentricity immediately charms Sofia ... as well as Greg, even though she doesn't notice the signs that he continually sends her.
 Romolo Guerreri as Greg, A fashion genius: his dream is to become a designer. Indeed, the way he dresses leaves no doubt as to what his true passion is. His shyness and hypochondria, along with his great talent, make him the ideal victim for Marion's tyranny, against which he tries to rebel in vain. He seems to live in a world of his own. His hypochondria makes him afraid of everything around him and causes him to foresee a catastrophic outcome to the different situations in which he finds himself. In a totally unexpected manner, he falls in love with Greta, the girl furthest away from “fashion” in the strictest sense, and will have to find the courage to express his feelings for her.
 Katsiaryna Shulha as Marion, Marion is the only student who, notoriously, got a place at the Academy thanks to someone pulling strings because ... she is the Principal's daughter. For this reason, she is the terror of all the students; anyone who isn't nice to her, who doesn't shower her with compliments or dares to laugh during her performances ... is immediately summoned to the Principal's office. Marion is the boss and all others are at her feet, starting with Greg. She doesn't know the word “please,” no one has ever heard her apologize and the school is where she is the undisputed dictator. The only person that she fears is Allegra who could undermine her stature. After an initial failed attempt to become friends, Marion has decided to systematically destroy Allegra. She doesn't miss a single opportunity to mock her and attempt to humiliate her. She has no talent, even if she firmly believes that she is the best in every discipline. Marion has just one passion ... herself! She often opens the compact that she carries in her purse and looks at herself, talking to her own reflection ... like any self-respecting witch!
 Gianmarco Pozzoli as Professor De Blasi, Tutor of the group of five first-year students, a task that he carries out more or less in his own way. De Blasi is a rather odd man. His whole life is governed by a single passion: the composition of the musical that he has been working on for 17 years! He is continually searching for sounds, murmurs and words that conceal perfect harmony within them. He often freezes completely and starts writing frantically on his hands which are always covered with notes: a new chord has just come to him. No one believes that he will ever find it after all these years spent pursuing this dream. However, to everyone's surprise, he ends up providing the lyrics for the musical that the students will work on for their year end project. Because of his eccentric nature, De Blasi is a friendly man with whom the students like to spend their time.
 Francesco Salvi as Sirio Perri (season 1),  A good man but fairly gruff and very pragmatic. His inability to understand his daughter's passion is not down to meanness, but to what he sees as its distance from real life. A widower from an early age, when Sofia was just one year old, he has never remarried and has devoted himself solely to his daughter and to his work as a mechanic. Years ago, he worked for Ferrari. But those days are over and all his memories, photos, uniforms and badges, are kept in a box that even Sofia has never opened. Thanks to Bart and to the enthusiasm with which he asks Sirio about those days, he will open that box again, dusting off an old dream.
 Alessandro Fella as Patrick (season 2),  is a 17-year-old handsome young man who is admired and loved by all. He is from Dublin and has come to Talent High School for one year as an exchange student. He's cheerful, nice and is able to stun people with his smile and leaves the girls breathless (Allegra and Marion are the first). He's a DJ and is world renown, a real legend at the console! Before becoming a successful DJ, he was a very promising young boxer who won International competitions. Yet his dreams were broken all too soon due to a serious injury that cost him his career. After the accident, he found the strength to start over thanks to this passion at the console. Even though Sofia is forced to lie about her real identity, she is immediately won over by this sweet boy who never has too many problems and is always available. At least that's what it seems...  Patrick is called to substitute Bart and participate with Allegra in the Dance Competition finals, but pulls out at the last minute, showing himself for who he really is- a cynical young man who has let life disappoint him and has lost the ability to believe in dreams!

Season 1 (2012)

Season 2 (2013)

See also
List of Italian television series

External links
 Official page on the site of Lux Vide
 
 Official Facebook page

Italian television series
2012 Italian television series debuts
2013 Italian television series endings